Broadway Danny Rose is a 1984 American black-and-white comedy film written and directed by Woody Allen. It follows a hapless theatrical agent who, by helping a client, gets dragged into a love triangle involving the mob. The film stars Allen as the titular character, as well as Mia Farrow and Nick Apollo Forte.

Broadway Danny Rose was screened out of competition at the 1984 Cannes Film Festival and received positive reviews from critics. It is considered one of Allen's stronger efforts, being praised particularly for Farrow's performance.

Plot
The story of Danny Rose (Woody Allen) is told in flashback, an anecdote shared amongst a group of comedians over lunch at New York's Carnegie Deli.

Rose's one-man talent agency represents countless unorthodox, unsuccessful entertainers, including washed-up lounge lizard Lou Canova (Nick Apollo Forte), whose career is on the rebound. While shown to be willing to hire almost anyone, Danny is also shown to work extremely hard for his acts—often catering to almost every one of their needs, both personal and professional. On those rare occasions any of Danny's acts do succeed, they invariably leave him for more professional representation.

Lou, who has a wife and three kids, is having an affair with a woman, Tina (Mia Farrow), who had previously dated a gangster (a man still in love with her). Lou wants her to accompany him to a big gig Danny has landed for him at the Waldorf Astoria, where he will perform in front of Milton Berle, who could potentially hire him for even bigger things.

At the singer's insistence, Danny acts as a "beard," masquerading as Tina's boyfriend to divert attention from the affair. Tina's ex-boyfriend is extremely jealous, and believing Tina's relationship with Danny to be real, he orders a hit on Danny, who finds himself in danger of losing both his client and his life. The ex-boyfriend's brothers find Danny and Tina and hold them in an abandoned warehouse.

Danny and Tina narrowly escape, as Danny at gunpoint says Tina's real boyfriend is a talentless nightclub performer, someone who Danny believes is on a cruise and is thus safe for a time. While the gangsters try to find the "real" boyfriend, Danny and Tina escape. They eventually show up at the Waldorf to find Lou drunk and unprepared to perform. Danny sobers Lou with a unique concoction that he has come up with over the years. Lou sobers up, and gives a command performance. With a new prestigious talent manager in attendance at the performance, Lou, in front of Tina (and with her encouragement), fires Danny and hires the new manager.

Danny, feeling cheated, goes to the Carnegie Deli where he hears that the performer he "ratted on" to save himself was beaten up by the hit men (the cruise had been cancelled) and is now in the hospital. Danny goes to the hospital to console his client and pays his hospital bills.

Lou, who has left his wife and kids to marry Tina, becomes a success. Tina, feeling guilty for not sticking up for Danny, is depressed and they eventually split up. It is now Thanksgiving and Danny is hosting a party with all of his clients there. Tina shows up to the door and apologizes, asking Danny to remember his uncle Sidney's motto, "acceptance, forgiveness, and love." At first Danny turns Tina away, but later catches up with her and they appear to make up. During this closing shot, the voiceover of the group of comedians talking about the story is heard. They praise Danny, and say that he was eventually awarded Broadway's highest honor: a sandwich at Broadway's best-known deli was named after him.

Cast

Steve Rossi claimed he was offered the Lou Canova role but Allen reneged when Allen was told that the film would be known as an Allen and Rossi film. Robert De Niro and Sylvester Stallone both turned down the role.

Soundtrack

 Agita - Written and Performed by Nick Apollo Forte
 My Bambina - Written and Performed by Nick Apollo Forte
 Funiculi, Funicula (1880) (uncredited) - Music by Luigi Denza
 The Band Played On (1895) (uncredited) - Music by Chas. B. Ward
 All of You (1957) (uncredited) - Music and Lyrics by Cole Porter
 You're Nobody till Somebody Loves You (1944) (uncredited) - Written by Russ Morgan, Larry Stock, and James Cavanaugh
 Torna a Surriento (Return to Sorrento)(1902) (uncredited) - Music by Ernesto De Curtis
 Begin the Beguine (1935) - Music by Cole Porter
 Ciribiribin - Music by Alberto Pestalozza - Lyrics by Carlo Tiochet

Reception

Box office
Broadway Danny Rose opened on January 27, 1984 in 109 North American theatres, grossing $953,794 ($8,750 per screen) in its opening weekend. When it expanded to 613 theatres on February 17, its results were less impressive - $2,083,455 on the weekend ($3,398 per screen). Its total domestic gross was $10,600,497, off an $8 million budget.

Critical response
Broadway Danny Rose received a very positive reception from critics. It holds a 100% positive "Fresh" rating from critics on Rotten Tomatoes based on 26 reviews, with a weighted average of 8.06/10. The site's consensus reads: "Woody Allen's hard-working, uphill-climbing Broadway talent agent is rendered memorably with equal parts absurdity and affection."

Roger Ebert of the Chicago Sun-Times awarded the film three and a half stars out of four, praising Allen, Forte, and Farrow, whom he described as "the real treasure among the performances."  Janet Maslin of The New York Times described Danny Rose as "one of the funniest and most touching characters Mr. Allen has yet created" and added, "Broadway Danny Rose [...] proceeds so sweetly and so illogically that it seems to have been spun, not constructed."  Time Out praised the combination of style and substance, stating, "The jokes are firmly embedded in plot and characterisation, and the film, shot by Gordon Willis in harsh black-and-white, looks terrific; but what makes it work so well is the unsentimental warmth pervading every frame."

In a 2016 poll of Time Out contributors, Broadway Danny Rose was ranked Allen's sixth greatest film, with editor Joshua Rothkopf praising "Mia Farrow's brassy Italian ballbuster, a wild transformation you’ll never forget." Sam Fragoso of IndieWire also lauded Farrow's "wonderfully out-of-type performance" and listed the work as a highlight of Allen's career. The Daily Telegraph film critics Robbie Collin and Tim Robey named it the director's ninth best effort, praising Farrow's acting and writing for making the film's titular character "one of Woody’s most snugly tailored roles: instantly funny, a little sad, and right up at the most endearing end of the characters he’s played."

In October 2013, Broadway Danny Rose was voted by Guardian readers as the fifth best film directed by Allen.

Accolades

Release

Home media
Broadway Danny Rose was released through MGM Home Entertainment on DVD on November 6, 2001.  A limited edition Blu-ray of 3,000 units was released by Twilight Time on April 8, 2014.

Legacy 
Actor Alec Baldwin has discussed how he has, with some degree of regularity, "hosted parties where the only activity is just watching Broadway Danny Rose together".

References

External links
 
 
 

1984 films
1980s screwball comedy films
American screwball comedy films
American black-and-white films
Films directed by Woody Allen
Films set in New York City
Films shot in New Jersey
Films shot in New York City
Orion Pictures films
Films with screenplays by Woody Allen
Films produced by Robert Greenhut
Films whose writer won the Best Original Screenplay BAFTA Award
1984 comedy films
1980s English-language films
1980s American films